Point Arguello (Spanish: Punta Argüello) is a headland on the Gaviota Coast, in Santa Barbara County, California, near the city of Lompoc. The area was first used by the United States Navy in 1959 for the launch of military and sounding rockets. It was transferred to the United States Air Force in 1964, at which time it became part of Vandenberg Air Force Base.

History 
In 1769, the Spanish Portola expedition became the first Europeans to explore this area by land. Soldiers of the expedition named a nearby point Los Pedernales or Punta Pedernales, because they found flints there. The entire point was given that name on some early maps but, in 1792, British naval explorer George Vancouver dubbed it Point Arguello, for José Darío Argüello, a Spanish frontier soldier who was Commandant of the Presidio of Santa Barbara and acting governor of Alta California.

A High-frequency direction finding (HFDF) was established here by the Navy during World War II. These radio intercept sites along the coast could track Japanese warships and merchant marine vessels as far away as the Western Pacific. The other stations in California were at Farallon Islands, Point Saint George, and San Diego. Bainbridge Island, Washington also hosted a station.

Launch pads 
Rockets listed in italics were launched from the complex after its transfer to Vandenberg Air Force Base in 1964.

See also 

 Point Arguello Light
 Honda Point disaster

References

External links 
 Encyclopedia Astronautica

Arguello
Arguello
United States Air Force
Vandenberg Space Force Base